Revolutionary Mass Festivals (in Russian массовые праздники), or Mass Spectacles, were participatory, staged cultural events held in the Soviet Union. They were held during the period of the Russian Civil War following the October Revolution of 1917. Experimental in nature, they united the Marxist-Leninist ideology of re-education of the masses and the aesthetics of the Russian avant-garde. The revolutionary mass festivals built upon the tradition of fairs and carnivals, and were part of the subsequently institutionalized public holidays and their official celebration in the Soviet Union. In contrast to these earlier versions of public festivals, the early revolutionary mass festival was often produced ad hoc without a distinct guideline. However, they became crucial events in the active construction of historical myths.

Pre-revolutionary predecessors 

Staged or semi-staged mass festivals have a long history dating back as far as to the ancient Saturnalia, medieval carnivals and mystery plays. They were appropriated by the French Revolution, with the first event of its kind being the funeral parade for Voltaire, which Jacques-Louis David organized in 1791. 
Russia too shared a tradition of public festivals. On the one hand, parades were organized by the state on the occasion of coronations and in order to commemorate events of political or military significance, such as the victory over Napoleon in 1812 or bicentennial anniversary of the foundation of Saint Petersburg held in 1903. On the other hand, the Russian Orthodox liturgical calendar included annual religious processions (in Russian крестные ходы). Finally, strike marches, illegal May Day celebrations and funeral marches for fallen revolutionaries were a central element of the revolutionary movement since the 1890s. The Soviet mass festival draws heavily on these traditions, since they not only commemorate central events of political history but, by representing a new anti-religious ideology, they also assume and replace the spiritual position formerly held by the church.

Ideological purpose 

One of the problems following the aftermath of the Russian Revolution was that channels of communication between the vanguard revolutionary elite and the masses had to be created. The circulation of print media was limited, as was the overall literacy of the people (around 43% in 1917).  Mass Festivals provided a channel for communication, especially as they offered a certain idea of cultural continuity for the people. In charge of the cultural, educational, and propaganda policy after the revolution Anatoly Lunacharsky acted as the People's Commissar of Enlightenment (Narkompros). With the aim of propagandistic re-education of the masses, Narkompros sought to cooperate with Russian artists from both the World of Art society and the avant-garde. Thus, the constructivist artists Vladimir Tatlin and, later, Alexei Gan were in charge of the Narkompros activities in Moscow.

Anatoly Lunacharsky’s vision of the Mass Festival 

In his article “On the People’s Festivals” (“О народных празднествах,” first in Vestnik Teatra 62/1920), Anatoly Lunacharsky explores the theatrical form and the ideological content of the mass festival.

As Lunacharsky points out in "On the People's Festivals," the traditions of ancient Greek spectacles and David's festivals on the aftermath of the French Revolution informed his notions of Soviet mass festivals within the post-revolutionary Russian context. The festivals' potential for entertainment serve to activate the masses. For this reason, Lunacharsky encourages the conscious appropriation of music, dance, language, and visual arts. At the same time, he clearly states that entertainment cannot be an end in itself. The festivals have to serve a higher educational purpose.

Here, the opposition between the spontaneity of the people vs. the revolution overlooked by a party elite (one of the central dichotomies of the Russian Revolution) is reflected directly. While the people's spontaneity needs to be triggered, Lunacharsky defends the ideal of deliberate organization even of the spontaneous elements. The mass festivals have to be strictly coordinated. Only by such means will the festivals be able to convey a distinct and controllable educational content. Thus, Lunacharsky's approach attempts, through theatrical staging, to combine education and entertainment of the masses under the premises of political propaganda.

Characteristics of stagings between 1918 and 1920

Decorations and “stage” designs 

The emergence of the post-revolutionary mass festivals is closely linked to the question of the re-configuration of historical memory, as evidenced by monuments in cities all over Russia. Accordingly, the Narkompros issued a decree "On Monuments of the Republic," which called for the immediate dismantling of tsarist monuments. This decree shows, however, that the new monuments should not be mere objects of historicist contemplation but rather designed as parts of a constructive process that harbored in the mass celebrations.

The first festival to take place was on May Day 1918. In Moscow, the constructivist architects Alexander and Viktor Vesnin designed the decorations for it. In Petrograd, the decorations for the first May Day parade were also commissioned to avant-garde artists, commonly referred to as "futurists." Even at that moment, the potential of abstract art to help bring about the re-education of the masses was considered disputable. Lunacharsky noted in hist diary:

The Petersburg Celebrations of the first Anniversary of the Revolution in 1918 were significantly larger than the May Day celebrations. They involved numerous architects and artists in 85 separate projects across the city.  The most prominent of these projects were the decorations for the Palace Square, then called Uritsky Square, by the cubist painter Natan Altman. In his designs he contrasted the neoclassical architectural ensemble of the square with abstract constructions that were intended to represent the political new order. The conflict between new and old was thereby visualized and allowed the spectator to physically experience it within the city space. For Altman art gains its meaning structurally, through collective interaction only. This is the constitutive feature of proletarian art, which accounts for the political relevance of his decorations.  However, this approach does not necessarily allow for an obligatory political content of art, which is attacked by the majority of later Soviet criticism of the avant-garde.

Later celebrations, especially Nikolai Evreinov's "Storming of the Winter Palace" of 1920, put stronger emphasis on the actual acting rather than on the decorations. The last extensive project of decorations was planned for the celebrations commemorating the Third International in 1921 by the constructivists Alexander Vesnin and Liubov Popova. It was supposed to be large-scale open air installation consisting of a model of a “Fortress of Capitalism” and the “Communist Future City,” connected by ties and banners that were to be held up by airships. The envisioned site for this installation was the Khodinka field in northern Moscow. The site was meant to serve as the stage for a historical mass spectacle restaging the struggle of the proletarian revolution. However, Vesnin's and Popova's plans were not realized which is indicative of the underlying conflict between avant-garde aesthetics and Marxist ideology.

Actors and spectators 

The last of the great mass spectacles was Nikolai Evreinov's “Storming of the Winter Palace”  and it was the largest in terms of involved actors and spectators. It was performed for the third anniversary of the October Revolution in 1920, when it was staged directly on the Palace Square and in the Winter Palace in Petrograd. The battleship Aurora, whose shot set off the revolutionary events in 1917, again gave the starting signal. Nikolai Evreinov directed a mass of 8,000 performers, many of whom were amateurs recruited from the army. The event also marks a turning point, because, in contrast to prior celebrations, it was meticulously orchestrated – despite its massive number of participants and spectators, from whom the event demanded strict discipline in order not to turn into mere chaos. The action was centered around the two confronting parties of the revolution, which were stationed on two platforms – a "red" platform representing the proletariat, and a "white" platform representing Kerensky's provisional government and the bourgeoisie. It is documented that 2,685 participants were on the "white" platform, including 125 ballet dancers, and 100 circus artists.

The event in 1920 was attended by large numbers of spectators - according to estimates around 100,000. It is important to note that the borders between spectatorship and acting were not quite clear, since playing a role in the staging ultimately also meant experiencing the staging as such. Even though Evreinov used light and sound effects, the audience's perception of actual action beyond the impression of the overwhelmingness of the event was, however, most likely limited. It is a characteristic feature of the revolutionary mass spectacles that, unlike traditional theatrical stagings, they conveyed subjective experience rather than a total experience of the events in their entirety.

Reception and cultural impact 

The early mass celebrations were permeated by an air of carnivalesque joy and the people's notion of finally achieved freedom. This may appear highly paradoxical in the midst of the violence and economic hardship that the revolution had brought about. The participatory spectatorship at the “Storming of the Winter Palace” is the most vivid example of how the mass spectacle created historical myth, and replaced the"reality" of the significantly less dramatic events of the 1917 revolution with a more impressive memory. Accordingly, for his 1928 movie October: Ten Days That Shook the World, Sergei Eisenstein chose to represent not an accurate picture of the 1917 storming of the Winter Palace, but rather Evreinov's re-enactment.

In her analysis of the revolutionary mass spectacle, Susan Buck-Morss discusses the dual nature of these stagings and their complicated relation to state power. They perpetuate a historical past into the present and it is not clear, whether the power over this past actually lies in the hands of the masses any longer or whether it is instead orchestrated by the state, which paradoxically achieved its power through those very revolutionary actions. In re-staging the revolution, the state seeks confirmation of this power, but at the same time the stagings inevitably lack the liberating character of a spontaneous revolution. This inherent ambivalence of the revolutionary mass festivals explains why, as a genre, they were later eschewed in favor of the more uniform annual Soviet holidays such as May Day, the anniversary of the Revolution, and - after World War II - Victory Day.

List of Mass Festivals

Notes

References 
 
 
 
 
 

Russian Civil War